Howard “Howe” Gelb (born October 22, 1956, in Wilkes-Barre, Pennsylvania) is an American singer-songwriter, musician and record producer based in Tucson, Arizona.

Projects
Gelb's approach to music is collaborative and he has recorded with a number of side projects. In a 2004 interview with Gelb, The Guardian wrote "Gelb's way of dealing with it was to treat Giant Sand (not to be confused with his 1970s electro-rock band Giant Sandworms) as a loose, uncompetitive, mutually supportive musical collective, a place for friends to hang out and play. 'I just liked the idea of having this kind of removed world, this brotherhood—the idea of a band being something more than a front person or dealing with the throes of fame.'"

In 2013, he worked with the Scottish singer/songwriter KT Tunstall on her fourth studio album Invisible Empire // Crescent Moon. He co-wrote and co-produced, and sang on several songs. His own solo album entitled The Coincidentalist was released on New West Records in November 2013.

Discography

Giant Sand
Valley of Rain (1985)
Ballad of a Thin Line Man (1986)
Storm (1987)
The Love Songs (1988)
Long Stem Rant (1989)
Swerve (1990)
Ramp (1991)
Center of the Universe (1992)
Stromausfall (1993)
Purge & Slouch (1994)
Glum (1994)
Goods and Services (1995)
Backyard Barbecue Broadcast (1995)
Build Your Own Night It's Easy (1997)
Chore of Enchantment (2000)
The Rock Opera Years (2000)
Unsungglum (2001)
Cover Magazine (2002)
Selections Circa 1990-2000 (Compilation, 2001)
Infiltration of Dreams (2003)
Too Many Spare Parts in the Yard Too Close at Hand (2003)
Is All Over the Map (2004)
Provisions (2008)
Provisional Supplement (2008)
Blurry Blue Mountain (2010)
Tucson (2012)
Heartbreak Pass (2015)
The Sun Set Vol.1 [Vinyl LP] (2017)
Returns To Valley Of Rain (2018)

Arizona Amp and Alternator
Arizona Amp and Alternator (2005)
The Open Road (2016)

Howe Gelb
Dreaded Brown Recluse (1991)
Hisser (1998)
Upside Down Home (1998)
Upside Down Home 2000 (2000)
Confluence (2001)
Lull Some Piano (2001)
The Listener (2003)
Upside Down Home 2002 (2003)
Ogle Some Piano (2004)
The Listener's Coffee Companion (2004)
Upside Down Home 2004: Year of the Monkey (2004)
'Sno Angel Like You (2006)
Fourcast: Flurries (2006)
Upside Down Home 2007: Return to San Pedro (2007)
Spun Some Piano (2008)
'Sno Angel Winging It (Live album) (2009)
Alegrías (2010)
Melted Wires (2010)
Snarl Some Piano (2011)
Dust Bowl (2013)
The Coincidentalist (2013)
Future Standards (2016)
Further Standards (2017) [with Lonna Kelley]
Cocoon (2020)

The Band of Blacky Ranchette
The Band of Blacky Ranchette (1985)
Heartland (1986)
Sage Advice (1990)
Still Lookin' Good to Me (2003)

OP8
Slush (1997)

Filmography 
Drunken Bees (1996) – Giant Sand documentary by Marianne Dissard
Looking for a Thrill: An Anthology of Inspiration (2005) – Howe Gelb interviewed
High and Dry: Where the Desert Meets Rock and Roll (2006) – documentary which includes music and interviews with Giant Sand members
This Band Has No Members (2006) – Howe Gelb solo concert film of his Japan tour in 2005
Ingenious (2009) - feature film soundtrack
Jackie (2012) - actor, "Paul"

References

External links

Ow Om Records

Living people
American country singer-songwriters
Musicians from Tucson, Arizona
American alternative country singers
American indie rock musicians
1956 births
Country musicians from Arizona
Singer-songwriters from Arizona